Sayoojyam is a 1979 Indian Malayalam-language film,  directed by G. Premkumar and produced by Sukuprasad. The film stars Jayabharathi, M. G. Soman, Jayan and Thikkurissy Sukumaran Nair. The film has musical score by K. J. Joy.

Plot
Rama (Jayabharathi) believes that her lover Balan (M G Soman) and child are dead. She is persuaded by her parents to marry Rajan (Jayan). Unfortunately she can't conceive a second time.She's shocked when Rajan brings his blind friend home for treatment -for he is none other than her old lover. She also learns that her child is in fact alive and in an orphanage.
She begins visiting the child secretly. When Rajan learns the truth he forbids her from seeing the child again. But when her son falls sick and calls for her, she has to break all promises to run to his bedside. Rajan accepts Rama's son as his own and brings his wife and child home.

Cast

Jayabharathi as Rama
MG Soman as Balan
Jayan as Rajan
Thikkurissy Sukumaran Nair as Madhavan Thampi (Rama's Father)
Sreelatha Namboothiri as Aamina
T. R. Omana as Balan's Mother
Aranmula Ponnamma as Lakshmi Amma (Rama's Mother)
K. P. A. C. Azeez as Raghavan
Jalaja as Radha
Poojappura Ravi
Kollam G. K. Pillai

Soundtrack
The music was composed by K. J. Joy and the lyrics were written by Yusufali Kechery.

References

External links

view film 
 saayoojyam 1979

1979 films
1970s Malayalam-language films